The Roßkopf is a mountain in the Austrian state of Tyrol in the Kitzbühel Alps. To the northeast an arête descends to the Marchbachjoch or Markbachjoch (1,496 m); another ridge runs northeast to the Kirchköpfl (1,487 m) and a third to the Turmkogel (1,648 m) to the south. The summit of the Roßkopf is the highest in the local area. It is marked by a large summit cross.

The summit may be climbed on a number of routes, most of which are designated as "easy", and is also a destination for snowshoe tours.

Access 
 By bus from Wörgl to Wildschönau.

Ascents 
From Niederau in der Wildschönau:
 On foot via the Marchbachjoch (1,496 m) and the Halsgatterl (1,562 m), easy, duration: 3 hrs, 50 min.
 Via gondola lift to the Marchbachjoch; footpath over the Halsgatterl to the summit, easy, duration: 2 hours.
 On foot via the Anton Graf Hut and Kircherköpfl, easy, duration: 3 hours.
From Wildschönau Oberau:
 On foot via the Roßkopf Hut, very steep, easy, duration: 2½ hours.
 On foot to the Baumgartenhof and Baumgartenalm. Footpath to Anton Graf Hut or Norderberg snack bar (Way No. 23). Over the "Halsgatterl", fairly steep climb to summit.

References 

Mountains of the Alps
Mountains of Tyrol (state)
One-thousanders of Austria
Kitzbühel Alps